Mpinstin   is a town in the Western region of Ghana. It is 4.4 kilometres from the centre Sekondi  Takoradi the Western regional capital. It serves as a dormitory town for workers who work in and around the Takoradi metropolis.

Boundaries
The town is bordered on Inchaban on the East, Kojokrom on the West, Inchaban Nkwanta on the North and Ngyiresia on the south.

References

Populated places in the Western Region (Ghana)